Rönninge Salem Fotboll is a Swedish football club located in Rönninge.

Background
Rönninge Salem Fotboll is the result of a merger of the football sections of Rönninge SK (formed 1923) and IFK Salem (formed 1972). The merger took place in 1991 and the first season was in 1992.
In 1989 Rönninge SK men's team played in Division 3 Östra Svealand.

Rönninge Salem Fotboll currently plays in the women's Division 3 B (which is the fifth tier of Swedish women's football) and the men's Division 5 Stockholm Södra (which is the seventh tier of Swedish men's football). They play their home matches at the Berga IP in Rönninge.

The club is affiliated to Stockholms Fotbollförbund.

Season to season

Footnotes

External links
 Rönninge Salem Fotboll – Official website
 RSF - Rönninge Salem Fotboll on Facebook

Football clubs in Stockholm
1991 establishments in Sweden